This is a list of places in Wales which have standing links to local communities in other countries known as "town twinning" (usually in Europe) or "sister cities" (usually in the rest of the world).

A
Abergavenny

 Beaupréau-en-Mauges, France
 Östringen, Germany

Abergele
 Roissy-en-Brie, France

Abertillery
 Royat, France

Aberystwyth

 Arklow, Ireland
 Esquel, Argentina
 Kronberg im Taunus, Germany
 Saint-Brieuc, France

B
Bala
 Bala (Muskoka Lakes), Canada

Bagillt
 Laxey, Isle of Man

Bangor
 Soest, Germany

Blaenavon
 Coutras, France

Brecon

 Dhampus, Nepal
 Gouesnou, France
 Saline, United States

Bridgend

 Langenau, Germany
 Villenave-d'Ornon, France

Briton Ferry
 Ouagadougou, Burkina Faso

Broughton and Bretton
 Auzeville-Tolosane, France

Brynmawr
 Camors, France

C
Caernarfon

 Landerneau, France
 Trelew, Argentina

Caerphilly

 Ludwigsburg, Germany
 Písek, Czech Republic

Caldicot

 Morières-lès-Avignon, France
 Waghäusel, Germany

Cardiff

 Luhansk, Ukraine
 Nantes, France
 Stuttgart, Germany
 Xiamen, China 

Cardigan

 Brioude, France
 Trevelin, Argentina

Carmarthen

 As Pontes de García Rodríguez, Spain
 Lesneven, France

Colwyn Bay
 Roissy-en-Brie, France

Cowbridge
 Clisson, France

Crickhowell
 Scaër, France

Crymych

 Hlotse, Lesotho
 Plomelin, France

Cwmaman
 Pouldergat, France

Cwmbran
 Bruchsal, Germany

D
Denbigh
 Biebertal, Germany

Dolgellau
 Guérande, France

F
Fishguard and Goodwick
 Loctudy, France

Flintshire
 Menden, Germany

G
Glynneath
 Pont-Évêque, France

Gorseinon
 Ploërmel, France

Govilon
 Missillac, France

Gowerton
 La Gacilly, France

H
Haverfordwest
 Oberkirch, Germany

Hay-on-Wye

 Redu (Libin), Belgium
 Timbuktu, Mali

Holyhead
 Greystones, Ireland

Holywell
 Saint-Grégoire, France

I
Isle of Anglesey
 Dún Laoghaire, Ireland

K
Kidwelly
 Saint-Jacut-de-la-Mer, France

L
Llanberis
 Morbegno, Italy

Llanbradach
 Ploubezre, France

Llandeilo
 Le Conquet, France

Llandovery
 Pluguffan, France

Llandrindod Wells

 Bad Rappenau, Germany
 Contrexéville, France

Llandudno

 Champéry, Switzerland
 Wormhout, France

Llandybie
 Plonéour-Lanvern, France

Llandysul
 Plogonnec, France

Llanelli
 Agen, France

Llanfairfechan
 Pleumeleuc, France

Llangedwyn
 Omerville, France

Llanidloes
 Derval, France

Llantrisant
 Crécy-en-Ponthieu, France

Llantwit Major
 Le Pouliguen, France

Llanwrtyd Wells

 Český Krumlov, Czech Republic
 Mériel, France

Llwchwr
 Ploërmel, France

M
Machen
 Sautron, France

Machynlleth
 Belleville, United States

Milford Haven

 Romilly-sur-Seine, France
 Uman, Ukraine

Monmouth

 Carbonne, France
 Waldbronn, Germany

Monmouthshire
 Karlsruhe (district), Germany

Mumbles

 Havre de Grace, United States
 Hennebont, France

N
Narberth
 Ludlow, England, United Kingdom

Nefyn
 Puerto Madryn, Argentina

Newcastle Emlyn
 Plonévez-Porzay, France

Newport

 Heidenheim an der Brenz, Germany
 Kutaisi, Georgia

Newport, Pembrokeshire

 Annapolis, United States
 Plouguin, France

Newtown
 Les Herbiers, France

Neyland
 Sanguinet, France

Norton
 Ligné, France

P
Pembroke

 Bergen, Germany
 Pembroke, Malta

Pembroke Dock

 Bergen, Germany
 Pembroke, Malta

Penarth
 Saint-Pol-de-Léon, France

Pencoed

 Plouzané, France
 Waldsassen, Germany

Pontardawe
 Locminé, France

Pontarddulais
 Cobh, Ireland

Pontypool

 Bretten, Germany
 Condeixa-a-Nova, Portugal
 Longjumeau, France

Porthcawl
 Saint-Sébastien-sur-Loire, France

Porthmadog
 Wicklow, Ireland

Presteigne
 Ligné, France

R
Radyr and Morganstown
 Saint-Philbert-de-Grand-Lieu, France

Raglan
 Parcé-sur-Sarthe, France

Rhondda Cynon Taf

 Montélimar, France
 Nürtingen, Germany
 Ravensburg, Germany
 Wolfenbüttel (district), Germany

Ruthin
 Briec, France

S
St Asaph
 Bégard, France

St Clears
 Peillac, France

St Davids

 Matsieng, Lesotho
 Naas, Ireland
 Orléat, France

St Dogmaels
 Trédarzec, France

Swansea

 Cork, Ireland
 Ferrara, Italy
 Mannheim, Germany
 Pau, France
 Sinop, Turkey
 Wuhan, China

T
Torfaen
 Karlsruhe (district), Germany

Tredegar
 Orvault, France

Tregaron
 Plouvien, France

V
Vale of Glamorgan

 Fécamp, France
 Mouscron, Belgium
 Rheinfelden, Germany

W
Whitland
 Pipriac, France

Wrexham

 Märkischer (district), Germany
 Racibórz County, Poland

Y
Ystradgynlais
 Clarks Summit, United States

References

Wales
Lists of places in the United Kingdom
Wales
Wales geography-related lists
Populated places in Wales
Wales-related lists